Jake Prairie is an unincorporated community in northwest Crawford County, in the U.S. state of Missouri. The community is located on Missouri Route F approximately eight miles northwest of Cuba.

History
A post office called Jakes Prairie was established in 1875, and remained in operation until 1933. Tradition states the community was named after an Indian who lived near the site.

References

Unincorporated communities in Crawford County, Missouri
Unincorporated communities in Missouri